Pat Robinson may refer to:
Patricia Murphy Robinson, also known as Pat, African-American feminist
Pat Robinson, character in The Adventures of the Wilderness Family
Pat Robinson, musician on More Than Local

See also
Patricia Robinson, economist
Patrick Robinson (disambiguation)
Pat Robertson (born 1930), televangelist from the United States